Uyigue Igbe is a Nigerian politician and former Speaker of Edo State House of Assembly. In 2011, Uyigue Igbe won the ticket for Oredo West constituency to represent the constituency at the state House of Assembly.

Family  
Uyigue Igbe is the son of Chief Sam Odighi Igbe, the Iyase of Benin Kingdom.

See also 
Edo People

References 

Living people
People from Edo State
Year of birth missing (living people)